Democratic Taiwan was a magazine published by Organization for the Support of Democratic Movement in Taiwan (OSDMT).

History
The magazine was founded by the exiled activist  in 1979 and was distributed free of charge to promote democracy in Taiwan.

The magazine ceased publication in 1987, after martial law was lifted in Taiwan.

Archives
Selected volumes are archived below:

 Democratic Taiwan Archives
 University of Pittsburgh Library System
 Google Books

References

External links

Magazines established in 1979
Magazines disestablished in 1987
Chinese-language magazines
Defunct political magazines
Defunct magazines published in the United States